AEL BC may refer to:
 A.E.L. 1964 B.C., Greek basketball club
 AEL Limassol B.C., Cypriot basketball club